Hypomyrina nomenia, the orange playboy, is a butterfly in the family Lycaenidae. It is found in Nigeria, Cameroon, the Republic of the Congo, Angola, the Central African Republic, the Democratic Republic of the Congo, Uganda, Tanzania and Zambia. The habitat consists of forests.

Subspecies
Hypomyrina nomenia nomenia (Nigeria: west, south and the Cross River loop, Cameroon, Congo, Angola, Central African Republic, Democratic Republic of the Congo: Kivu)
Hypomyrina nomenia extensa Libert, 2004 (Uganda, western Tanzania, Democratic Republic of the Congo: Shaba, north-western Zambia)

References

External links

Die Gross-Schmetterlinge der Erde 13: Die Afrikanischen Tagfalter. Plate XIII 65 h

Butterflies described in 1874
Fauna of Rivers State
Deudorigini
Butterflies of Africa
Taxa named by William Chapman Hewitson